William Frank Brunner (September 15, 1887 –  April 23, 1965) was an American businessman and politician who four terms served as a member of the U.S. House of Representatives from New York from 1929 to 1935.

Early life
Born in Woodhaven, Queens, he attended the public schools, Far Rockaway High School in Far Rockaway, Queens, and Packard Commercial School in New York City. He moved to Rockaway Park, Queens in 1901, engaged in the insurance and real-estate business, and served in the United States Navy as a yeoman first class from 1917 to 1919.

Political career 
He was a member of the New York State Assembly (Queens Co., 5th D.) in 1922, 1923, 1924, 1925, 1926, 1927 and 1928.

Congress 
He was elected as a Democrat to the Seventy-first and to the three succeeding Congresses, holding office from March 4, 1929, until his resignation on September 27, 1935, having been elected sheriff of Queens County. He served as sheriff from 1935 until his resignation in 1936 and was president of the Board of Aldermen of New York City from January 1 to December 31, 1937.

Later career and death 
Brunner resumed the insurance and real-estate business and was Queens County commissioner of borough works from July 1 to December 31, 1941. He was an unsuccessful candidate for the Democratic nomination in 1942 and for election on the American Labor Party ticket to the Seventy-eighth Congress. He was president of Rockaway Beach Hospital (later named Peninsula General Hospital, then Peninsula Hospital Center) from 1946 to 1965. He died in Far Rockaway on April 23, 1965. Interment was in St. John's Cemetery, Middle Village.

References
 Retrieved on 2008-03-28

1887 births
1965 deaths
People from Woodhaven, Queens
United States Navy sailors
Military personnel from New York City
Democratic Party members of the New York State Assembly
Sheriffs of Queens County, New York
Far Rockaway High School alumni
Businesspeople from Queens, New York
Public officeholders of Rockaway, Queens
Democratic Party members of the United States House of Representatives from New York (state)
20th-century American politicians
20th-century American businesspeople